George Simmons may refer to:

 George Simmons (British Army officer) (1785–1858), British Army officer wounded at the Battle of Waterloo
 George Simmons (referee) (1866–1954), English football referee
 George A. Simmons (1791–1857), U.S. Representative from New York
 George F. Simmons (1925–2019), American mathematician
 George H. Simmons (1852–1937), English-born American physician

See also
 George Simmonds (1895–1973), Australian rules footballer
 George Blackall Simonds (1843–1929), English sculptor